Club Deportivo Suchitepéquez is a Guatemalan football club that competes in the Primera División de Ascenso, the second division in the nation. They are based in Mazatenango, Department of Suchitepéquez, and their home stadium is the Estadio Carlos Salazar Hijo. The team was founded in 1960, and won two Liga Nacional championships in 1983 and 2016.

History

1980s
In 1981, they defeated Spanish league champions Atlético Madrid 1–0 on a friendly match to re-open the Carlos Salazar stadium.

The team's most successful era took place in the mid-1980s. Having been runner-up in the 1982 domestic league, Suchitepéquez won the national league title in 1983, with a record of 16 wins, 4 draws, and 2 losses in 22 matches. The team was managed by the Uruguayan Julio César Cortés, a former Uruguayan international who played in three World Cups. The stars of this team were Uruguayan strikers César Eduardo Méndez and José Luis "Chopo" González.

Suchitepéquez went on to play in the 1983 CONCACAF Champions' Cup, beating Deportivo Saprissa in the first round. In the second round, they drew with Tigres UANL 1–1 in the first leg, and then beat them 3–0 at home, becoming the first Guatemalan football team to defeat a Mexican team in an official tournament. After that they faced Atlante, drawing the first match but losing 0–6 in the second leg to the eventual champions.

They finished second in the local league again in 1984, repeating that in the 1989–90 tournament.

1990s
In 1992, Suchitepéquez won the summer (cup) tournament, and then defeated the 1992 league champions Municipal in the Champion of champions ("Super Cup") match. They won further domestic cup (Copa de Guatemala) titles in 1993 and 1997.

Relegation
The club struggled to remain in the top division during the 1998–99 season, finishing next to last overall, and avoiding relegation in the last instance by winning a relegation play-off. The following year, they finished in last place overall, and were directly relegated.

2000s
After four years in Primera División, the club returned to the top division for the 2004–05 season, finishing fourth in the Torneo Apertura.

2010-2015
The club has been a constant top finisher in the Guatemalan top division but has fallen one game short of reaching the final twice. Currently the club has had solid seasons finishing in the top 3 and finished the Clausura 2015 season in 3rd place behind CSD Municipal and champions Comunicaciones. In the summer of 2014, the club signed Emiliano Lopez, an Argentine prospect who finished his first season as the second top scorer in the first division behind Guatemalan star and Municipal forward, Carlos Ruiz. He was the top scorer in the 2015 clausura tournament, with 12 goals.

2015-2016
The club played "La Final" against the champion of the last Clausura Tournament Comunicaciones FC, which in the Estadio Mateo Flores, Comunicaciones FC won the first leg of the Guatemalan championship, winning 2-1, but in the second leg, Suchitepequez came out victorious in their own stadium, Estadio Carlos Salazar Hijo. They won 3-0, making after waiting for 33 years, Suchitepequez champions for the 2nd time in their history.

Performance in CONCACAF  competitions
CONCACAF Cup Winners Cup: 2 appearances
1993 - 4th Place
1995 - Qualifying Stage (Central Zone)

CONCACAF Champions League: 2 appearances
1983 - Semifinals
2016-17 - Group stage

Honours

Domestic honours

Leagues
 Liga Nacional de Guatemala and predecessors 
 Champions (2): 1982-83, Clausura 2016

Current squad
As of 2022:

Notable players

  Ricardo Piccinini (GK), (1980s)
 Mario Acevedo (FW)
 Julio César Anderson (FW), (1967–69)
 Marvin Avila (FW), (2007)
 Fabricio Benítez (MF) (2007–10)
 Carlos Castañeda (MF), (1980s and 1990s)
 Manuel Coronado (DF), (1990s)
 Marco de la Cruz (GK), (1975–84)
 Rodrigo de Leon (FW)
 Ricardo Jerez Hidalgo (GK), (1960s)
 Alejandro Ortiz Obregón (DF), (1980s and 1990s)
 César "El Picho" Trujillo (FW), (2000s)
 Edwin Villatoro (FW), (2000s) [active]
 Julián Arturo Vargas (DF), (1980s)
 José Luís "Chopo" González (FW), (1980s)
 César Eduardo Méndez (FW), (1980s)

List of coaches

 Manuel Felipe Carrera (1961)
 Arnaldo da Silva (1965–66)
 Alberto Donis (1967)
 Jaime Ormazábal (1968, 1970)
 Adalberto Donis (1969)
 Néstor Valdés (1971)
 Arnaldo da Silva (1972–75)
 Emilio René Morales Hidalgo (1976)
 Justo Rufino López (1977)
 René Aquino Sánchez / Francisco Aquino Sánchez (1977–78)
 Oscar Raúl Cancinos Vásquez (1978–79)
 Salvador Pericullo (1979–80)
 Guillermo Vargas (1980, 1981, 1986)
 Alfonso Fernández (1981)
 Ricardo Sepúlveda (1981)
 Rafael Fernández (1981)
 Julio César Cortés (1982–84)
 Erasmo Arroyo (1985–86)
 Guillermo Batres (1986, 1989)
 Francisco Pineda (1987)
 Javier Mascaró (1987)
 Walter Enrique Claveríe Alvarado (1988–90)
 Manuel de Jesús Castañeda (1991)
 Leonso Contreras (1991)
 Carlos Castañeda (1991)
 Walter Claveríe (1992–93, 1996)
 Odilio Gómez (1993, 1994)
 Ricardo Piccinini (1993–94)
 Julio Hernández (1994)
 Oscar Sanchez (1994)
 Ernesto Arroyo (1994, 1998)
 Marco Antonio Matheu (1995)
 Manuel Castañeda (1997–98)
 Luís Villacencio (1999)
 Ever González (2000)
 Carlos de Toro (1999–00)
 Benjamín Monterroso (2005)
 Horacio Cordero (2005–07)
 Gabino Rivero (2007–08)
 Pedro Evangelista Rodríguez (2008)
 Julio César Antúnez (2008)
 Jorge Pineda (2008–09)
 Walter Claverí (2009–10)
 Agustin Castillo (2010)
 Richard Presa (2011–2013)
 Walter Claverí (2013–2016)
 Eduardo Mendez
 Gustavo Onaindia (2021-2022)
 Pablo Melgar (2022- )

Notes and references

External links
 Official web site - deportivosuchi.com
 Web page dedicated to the club - by Jorge Mario García
 1983 national title notes, including celebration pictures - literaturaguatemalteca.org
Club Profile - Soccerway

 
Suchitepequez
Association football clubs established in 1960
1960 establishments in Guatemala